Seillière is a French surname. It may refer to:

Ernest Seillière (1866–1955), French writer, journalist and critic
Ernest-Antoine Seillière (born 1937), French entrepreneur and the heir to the Wendel empire
Florentin Seillière (1744–1825), French businessman and banker